
Osaka or Ōsaka may refer to:
, Japan's third largest city by population, the capital of Osaka Prefecture.
, Japan's second smallest prefecture by area
 in Japan, which includes parts of Osaka and Hyōgo Prefectures
Osaka  may also refer to:

Other locations

Japan
Places called Osaka (小坂, meaning "small hill"):
Osaka, Gifu, former town
Osaka, Gunma former village
Neighbourhoods called Ōsaka  (逢坂, meaning "meeting hill") are situated in the following locations:
Tennōji Ward, Ōsaka 
Ōtsu, Shiga Prefecture, the location of Mount Ōsaka
Shijōnawate City, Osaka Prefecture
Kashiba, Nara

United States
Osaka, Virginia

Football clubs in Japan
FC Osaka
Cerezo Osaka
Cerezo Osaka Sakai Ladies
Gamba Osaka
Konomiya Speranza Osaka-Takatsuki
Shriker Osaka

Music and film 
Osaka Elegy, a 1936 Japanese film
Osaka Story, a 1999 Japanese drama film
Osaka Monaurail, a Japanese funk band
Osaka Popstar, a punk rock supergroup
Osaka Ramones, a Japanese pop-punk group
 Osaka (album) by The Kickovers
 "Osaka", a song from the Hella album Tripper

Other uses
 Osaka (surname), a Japanese surname
 Ayumu Kasuga, character from Azumanga Daioh, nicknamed "Osaka"
 Mari Osaka, a Haitian-Japanese, retired tennis player and fashion designer born in Osaka, Japan
 Naomi Osaka, a Haitian-Japanese, professional tennis player born in Osaka, Japan
 Osaka Siren, an emergency equipment